Goodwin's Weekly was a periodical published in Salt Lake City, Utah from November 29, 1902 to 1929.  It was renamed to The Citizen in 1919.

It termed itself "A Thinking Paper for Thinking People".  Its editor was Charles Carroll Goodwin (d.1917);  the owner and manager was Goodwin's son James T. Goodwin.

References

External links
Goodwins Weekly at DigitalNewspapers

Newspapers published in Utah
1902 establishments in Utah